Mimoso do Sul is a municipality located in the Brazilian state of Espírito Santo. Its population was 26,115 (2020) and its area is 867 km².

The municipality contains part of the  Serra das Torres Natural Monument, created in 2010 to protect the mountain peaks in the area.

References

Municipalities in Espírito Santo